David Wainwright may refer to:

 David Wainwright (Yorkshire cricketer) (born 1985), English cricketer
 Dave Wainwright, British science fiction comedy writer